Collins Shivachi (born 12 April 1994) is a Kenyan international footballer who plays for A.F.C. Leopards, as a defender.

Career
Born in Kakamega, Shivachi has played club football for Western Stima, Sofapaka and Tusker.

He made his international debut for Kenya in 2015.

References

External links

1994 births
Living people
Kenyan footballers
Kenya international footballers
Western Stima F.C. players
Sofapaka F.C. players
Gor Mahia F.C. players
Tusker F.C. players
A.F.C. Leopards players
Kenyan Premier League players
Association football defenders
People from Kakamega